WLZN (92.3 FM, "Macon 92.3") is a radio station serving the Macon, Georgia area with an urban contemporary format. This station is under ownership of Cumulus Media.

On July 1, 2021, WLZN rebranded as "Macon 92.3".

Previous logo

References

External links
Macon 92.3 WLZN official website

Urban contemporary radio stations in the United States
LZN
Radio stations established in 1991
Cumulus Media radio stations